Bobby Few (October 21, 1935 – January 6, 2021) was an American jazz pianist and vocalist.

Early life 
Few was born in Cleveland, Ohio, and grew up in the Fairfax neighborhood of the city's East Side. Upon his mother's encouragement, he studied classical piano but later discovered jazz upon listening to his father's Jazz at the Philharmonic records. His father became his first booking agent and soon Few was gigging around the greater Cleveland area with other local musicians including Bill Hardman, Bob Cunningham, Cevera Jefferies and Frank Wright. He was exposed to Tadd Dameron and Benny Bailey as a youth and knew Albert Ayler, with whom he played in high school. As a young man, Few also gigged with local tenor legend Tony "Big T" Lovano – Joe Lovano's father.

Career 
In the late 1950s Few relocated to New York, where he led a trio from 1958 to 1964; there, he met and began working with many world-class musicians, including singer Brook Benton, and saxophonists Rahsaan Roland Kirk, Jackie McLean, Joe Henderson and Ayler. In 1969 he moved to France and rapidly integrated the expatriate jazz community, working frequently with Archie Shepp, Sunny Murray, Steve Lacy and Rasul Siddik. From 2001, he toured internationally with American saxophonist Avram Fefer, with whom he recorded four critically acclaimed CDs.

Few played extensively around Europe and made regular trips back to the United States. Recently, he played with saxophonist Charles Gayle and led his own trio in Paris. He was working on a Booker Ervin tribute project called Few's Blues that featured tenor player Tony Lakatos, bassist Reggie Johnson and drummer Doug Sides. Few was interviewed in a 2008 documentary, later released on DVD, on drummer Sunny Murray – "Sunny's Time Now".

Bobby Few died in January 2021, aged 85.

Playing style 
Some of Few's various playing styles were described by Kevin Whitehead: "He can play delicate single-note melodies, roll out lush romantic chords, rap out explicitly Monkish close-interval clanks – though he's a busier pianist than Monk – or roil around in classic free style, using a sustain pedal to shape the density of his sound".

Discography

As leader or co-leader

As sideman 
Years in brackets refer to dates of recording.

With Albert Ayler
Music is the Healing Force of the Universe (Impulse!, 1969)
The Last Album (Impulse!, 1969)
With Jacques Coursil
Trails of Tears (Sunnyside, 2010)
With Hans Dulfer
El Saxofón (Catfish, 1970)
With Mike Ellis
What Else is New? (Alfa, 1985)
With Booker Ervin
The In Between (Blue Note, 1968)
With Zusaan Kali Fasteau
Sensual Hearing (Flying Note, 1994–95)
Camaraderie (Flying Note, 1997)
Making Waves (Flying Note, 2004)
With Avram Fefer
Few and Far Between (Boxholder 2002) w/ Wilber Morris
Kindred Spirits (Boxholder, 2005)
Heavenly Places (Boxholder, 2005)
Sanctuary (CIMP, 2006) w/ Newman Taylor Baker, Hill Greene
With Ricky Ford
Songs for My Mother (Jazz Friends Production, 2001)
With Noah Howard
Space Dimension (America, 1969)
Red Star (Mercury, 1977)
Traffic (Frame, 1980)
In Concert (Cadence, 1997)
Live at the Unity Temple (Ayler, 1997)
With Talib Kibwe
Egyptian Oasis (Cryonic, 1986)
With Steve Lacy
Songs (hat ART, 1981) with Brion Gysin
Ballets (hat ART, 1981)
The Flame (Soul Note, 1982)
Blinks (hat ART, 1983)
Lift the Bandstand (1983) DVD
Prospectus (hat ART, 1983) also released as Cliches
The Condor (Soul Note, 1985)
The Gleam (Silkheart, 1986)
Momentum (RCA Novus, 1987)
The Door (RCA Novus, 1988)
Anthem (RCA Novus, 1989)
Itinerary (hat ART, 1991)
Live at Sweet Basil (RCA Novus, 1992)
Associates (Felmay 1992)
Clangs (hat ART, 1993)
Vespers (Soul Note, 1993)
Findings (CMAP, 1994)
With David Murray
Flowers Around Cleveland (Bleu Regard, 1995)
With Sunny Murray
Aigu-Grave (Marge, 1979)
With Archie Shepp
Pitchin Can (America, 1970)
Coral Rock (America, 1970)
With Alan Silva
Seasons (BYG, 1971)
H.Con.Res.57/Treasure Box (Eremite, 2003)
With Marzette Watts
The Marzette Watts Ensemble (Savoy, 1968)
With Joe Lee Wilson
Secrets From The Sun (Sun, 1977)
With Frank Wright
Uhuru na Umoja (Emarcy, 1970)
One for John (BYG, 1970)
Church Number Nine (Odeon, 1971)
Center of the World (Center of the World, 1972)
For Example – Workshop Freie Musik 1969–1978 (FMP, 1972)
Last Polka in Nancy? (Center of the World, 1973)
Unity (ESP-Disk, 1974)

References

External links 
[ AllMusic biography]
All About Jazz
 
 

1935 births
2021 deaths
American jazz pianists
American male pianists
Musicians from Cleveland
CIMP artists
20th-century American pianists
Jazz musicians from Ohio
21st-century American pianists
20th-century American male musicians
21st-century American male musicians
American male jazz musicians